Callum Slattery (born 8 February 1999) is an English professional footballer who plays as a midfielder for Scottish Premiership side Motherwell.

Professional career

Southampton 
In July 2017, Slattery signed a three-year professional contract with Southampton. Slattery was named in the starting eleven of the first team on 5 January 2019 in the FA Cup third round against Derby County at Pride Park.

De Graafschap 
On 31 January 2020, Slattery joined Eerste Divisie side De Graafschap on loan until the end of the season.

Gillingham 
On 14 January 2021, Slattery joined League One side Gillingham on loan for the remainder of the 2020–21 season.  He made his first appearance for the club two days later in a 1–0 victory against Accrington Stanley.

Motherwell 
On 24 July 2021, Slattery joined Motherwell on a three-year contract for an undisclosed fee.

International career
Slattery was part of the England team that won the 2017 Toulon Tournament. He scored the fourth penalty in the shoot-out in the final against Ivory Coast.

Personal life
Slattery was arrested by police in November 2021 after an incident in Glasgow city centre, during which he reportedly assaulted a police officer. In October 2022, Slattery appeared at Glasgow Sheriff Court and admitted two charges of behaving in a threatening or abusive manner, with one aggravated by prejudice related to sexual orientation. He was convicted and fined £1,350.

Career statistics

References

External links

 Southampton FC Profile

1999 births
Living people
Sportspeople from Oxfordshire
Association football midfielders
English footballers
Southampton F.C. players
De Graafschap players
Gillingham F.C. players
Motherwell F.C. players
Premier League players
Eerste Divisie players
Scottish Professional Football League players
England youth international footballers
English expatriate footballers
English expatriate sportspeople in the Netherlands